Gobindalal Roy (14 August 1927 – 27 October 1973) was an Indian cricketer. He played three first-class matches for Bengal between 1950 and 1952.

See also
 List of Bengal cricketers

References

External links
 

1927 births
1973 deaths
Indian cricketers
Bengal cricketers
People from Murshidabad district